

Ælfweard (died 1044) was a medieval Bishop of London.

A monk from Ramsey on the Isle of Man who became the Abbot of Evesham in 1014, Ælfweard became Bishop of London but retained Evesham. He was consecrated in 1035, but when he developed leprosy he was expelled from Evesham and he returned to Ramsey. He died on either 25 or 27 July 1044.

Citations

References

External links
 

Bishops of London
1044 deaths
Year of birth unknown
11th-century English Roman Catholic bishops